Elections were held in the Australian state of Queensland on 28 May 1966 to elect the 78 members of the Legislative Assembly of Queensland.

The major parties contesting the election were the Country Party led by Premier Frank Nicklin in coalition the Liberal Party, the Labor Party led by Jack Duggan.

The Country-Liberal coalition won a fourth term in office at the election.

Key dates

Results

|}

Seats changing hands 

 Members listed in italics did not recontest their seats.
 The sitting Labor MP for Hawthorne, Bill Baxter, lost preselection as the Labor candidate. He was expelled from the ALP for running against the selected candidate Thomas Burton. Previous election figures are Labor v Liberal.

See also
 Members of the Queensland Legislative Assembly, 1963–1966
 Members of the Queensland Legislative Assembly, 1966–1969
 Candidates of the Queensland state election, 1966
 Nicklin Ministry

References

Elections in Queensland
1966 elections in Australia
1960s in Queensland
May 1966 events in Australia